Buckhaven, Methil and Wemyss Villages is one of the 22 wards used to elect members of Fife Council. The ward elects four Councillors, covering the towns of Buckhaven and Methil, as well as the villages of East Wemyss, West Wemyss, and Coaltown of Wemyss.

Councillors

Election Results

2022 Election
2022 Fife Council election

2017 Election

2012 Election

2007 Election

References

Wards of Fife
Levenmouth